Hlavu vzhůru – volební blok, formerly Politika 21, was a small right-wing political party in the Czech Republic, established in 2006. The leader of the party was Jana Bobošíková, who had previously been a Member of the European Parliament.

References 

Eurosceptic parties in the Czech Republic
Political parties established in 2006
Defunct political parties in the Czech Republic